Olshanka is the name of several rural localities in Russia.

Modern localities
Olshanka, Belgorod Oblast, a selo in Chernyansky District of Belgorod Oblast
Olshanka, Lutensky Rural Administrative Okrug, Kletnyansky District, Bryansk Oblast, a village in Lutensky Rural Administrative Okrug of Kletnyansky District in Bryansk Oblast; 
Olshanka, Muzhinovsky Rural Administrative Okrug, Kletnyansky District, Bryansk Oblast, a village in Muzhinovsky Rural Administrative Okrug of Kletnyansky District in Bryansk Oblast; 
Olshanka, Chelyabinsk Oblast, a settlement in Chernoborsky Selsoviet of Chesmensky District in Chelyabinsk Oblast
Olshanka, Kaliningrad Oblast, a settlement in Kovrovsky Rural Okrug of Zelenogradsky District in Kaliningrad Oblast
Olshanka, Bolshesoldatsky District, Kursk Oblast, a settlement in Volokonsky Selsoviet of Bolshesoldatsky District in Kursk Oblast
Olshanka, Lgovsky District, Kursk Oblast, a selo in Olshansky Selsoviet of Lgovsky District in Kursk Oblast
Olshanka, Lipetsk Oblast, a village in Khvorostyansky Selsoviet of Dobrinsky District in Lipetsk Oblast; 
Olshanka, Republic of Mordovia, a settlement in Nadezhdinsky Selsoviet of Yelnikovsky District in the Republic of Mordovia; 
Olshanka, Novgorod Oblast, a village in Marevskoye Settlement of Maryovsky District in Novgorod Oblast
Olshanka, Oryol Oblast, a village in Nizhne-Zalegoshchensky Selsoviet of Zalegoshchensky District in Oryol Oblast
Olshanka, Bashmakovsky District, Penza Oblast, a selo in Sosnovsky Selsoviet of Bashmakovsky District in Penza Oblast
Olshanka, Belinsky District, Penza Oblast, a selo in Kozlovsky Selsoviet of Belinsky District in Penza Oblast
Olshanka, Penzensky District, Penza Oblast, a village in Voskresenovsky Selsoviet of Penzensky District in Penza Oblast
Olshanka, Rostov Oblast, a selo in Olshanskoye Rural Settlement of Tselinsky District in Rostov Oblast
Olshanka, Ryazan Oblast, a selo in Olshansky Rural Okrug of Miloslavsky District in Ryazan Oblast
Olshanka, Sakhalin Oblast, a selo in Uglegorsky District of Sakhalin Oblast
Olshanka, Arkadaksky District, Saratov Oblast, a selo in Arkadaksky District of Saratov Oblast
Olshanka, Samoylovsky District, Saratov Oblast, a selo in Samoylovsky District of Saratov Oblast
Olshanka, Smolensk Oblast, a village in Pechatnikovskoye Rural Settlement of Kholm-Zhirkovsky District in Smolensk Oblast
Olshanka, Chupovsky Selsoviet, Gavrilovsky District, Tambov Oblast, a village in Chupovsky Selsoviet of Gavrilovsky District in Tambov Oblast
Olshanka, Kirsanovsky District, Tambov Oblast, a selo in Sokolovsky Selsoviet of Kirsanovsky District in Tambov Oblast
Olshanka, Muchkapsky District, Tambov Oblast, a village in Troitsky Selsoviet of Muchkapsky District in Tambov Oblast
Olshanka, Uvarovsky District, Tambov Oblast, a selo in Verkhneshibryaysky Selsoviet of Uvarovsky District in Tambov Oblast
Olshanka, Znamensky District, Tambov Oblast, a selo in Kuzminsky Selsoviet of Znamensky District in Tambov Oblast
Olshanka, Volgograd Oblast, a khutor in Olshansky Selsoviet of Uryupinsky District in Volgograd Oblast

Abolished localities
Olshanka, Dmitriyevsky Selsoviet, Gavrilovsky District, Tambov Oblast, a village in Dmitriyevsky Selsoviet of Gavrilovsky District in Tambov Oblast; abolished in November 2011

Alternative names
Olshanka, alternative name of 1-ya Olshanka, a village in Dubovetsky Selsoviet of Dolgorukovsky District in Lipetsk Oblast; 
Olshanka, alternative name of Olshanka Vtoraya, a village in Kurgano-Golovinsky Selsoviet of Terbunsky District in Lipetsk Oblast;

See also
 
Olszanka (disambiguation)